Greenrow is a village in the civil parish of Holme Low in the Allerdale district of Cumbria, United Kingdom. It is located about 10 miles west of Wigton, near the town of Silloth.

Villages in Cumbria
Allerdale
Silloth